Miracle-Ear, Inc. is a hearing aid company consisting of a network of franchised and corporately-owned retail outlets. The company is a subsidiary of Amplifon, the worldwide distributor of hearing aids based in Italy. Miracle-Ear's U.S. headquarters are located in Minneapolis, Minnesota. As of 2014 it has more than 1,200 locations in the United States, and it is the best-known hearing aid brand in the U.S. In 2014, the company added several locations in Canada, with plans to open more Canadian outlets. According to the company, Miracle-Ear outlets offer free hearing tests and consultations, and the hearing aids include a risk-free 30-day trial period plus service, warranty, and lifetime after-care.<ref name=entrepreneur

Product history

Origins
"Miracle-Ear" began as a hearing aid manufactured by Dahlberg Electronics, an electronics company founded in 1948. Kenneth Dahlberg started Dahlberg Electronics after he left a position as assistant to the president of Telex Communications, another manufacturer of hearing aids. Prior to manufacturing hearing aids, Dahlberg's company produced pillow radios for hospitals and motels.

In the early 1950s, Dahlberg Electronics began producing hearing aids that utilized the newly invented transistor technology – beginning with "hybrid" hearing aids that used transistors and vacuum tubes, and then releasing an all-transistor model in 1953. In 1955, they introduced the first so-called "in-the-ear" hearing aid, the D-10 Magic Ear – which concealed all electronic components in a shell snapped onto an earmold, and weighed 1/2 ounce, including battery, three-transistor amplifier, microphone, and receiver. Other innovations included the D-14 "Solar Ear" eyeglasses hearing aid, which used a solar cell for power.

Further innovations
In 1962, the Miracle-Ear IV was the first hearing aid that used integrated circuitry, and in 1971, the company introduced the Dahlberg SHARP circuit, an ultra-low power circuit utilizing in-house hybrid production. In 1988, the company debuted the Miracle-Ear Dolphin, the first programmable hearing aid on the market. In 1997, following university testing, the United States Food and Drug Administration (FDA) approved claims on Miracle-Ear's Sharp Plus circuitry that the Miracle-Ear devices improved hearing in the presence of background noise.

In 1998 the Miracle-Ear Messenger was introduced, which featured proprietary technology that enabled the aid to be customized by the wearer. In 2003 the company's entire line of hearing aids went digital, and in 2005 Miracle-Ear brought out the innovative Open Fit design. In early 2011 the company announced the Miracle-Ear Mirage, an invisible completely in the canal hearing aid that fits deep in the ear canal.

Also in 2011, Miracle-Ear debuted a waterproof hearing aid, called the Aquavi, which is also dustproof and virtually shockproof to accommodate active lifestyles. It can be completely submerged in water up to three feet deep for up to 30 minutes without damage to the instrument, and has an IP rating of 68. In 2013, Miracle-Ear launched a new technology platform called ClearVation, which learns the wearer's individual preferences and delivers appropriate amplification levels, while preserving natural acoustics. The technology aims to provide a natural hearing experience with a self-customized balance of comfort and clarity, and is available across the Miracle-Ear product line.

Additional features
Miracle-Ear's MEBluConnect and mini MEBluConnect have a Bluetooth radio to receive sound from Bluetooth audio sources, such as cell phones and televisions. Its MEComConnect transmitter also enables electronic devices without Bluetooth capability to transmit Bluetooth audio. Miracle-Ear also offers a smartphone application for Android mobile devices, which allows hearing aid adjustments to be made from the smartphone.

Current styles
Miracle-Ear hearing aid styles include behind-the-ear (BTE), receiver-in-canal (RIC), in-the-ear (ITE), in-the-canal (ITC), and completely-in-the-canal (CIC) devices. The Mirage, an invisible CIC (completely-in-the-canal) hearing aid, uses microtechnology and includes feedback cancellation, digital noise reduction, programmable settings, peak smoothing, and SoundBoost volume control. Miracle-Ear's Aquavi model is waterproof, dustproof, and virtually shockproof.

In 2015, the company announced its new GENIUS technology hearing aids. According to the press release, the technology provides "up to 25% better speech recognition in challenging listening environments than people with normal hearing". The new line of hearing aids offer directional focus, removal of wind noise, zeroing-in on voices and conversations, and high-definition digital sound. They can be fine-tuned to accommodate any specific hearing-loss type, and can be adjusted on the spot to conditions such as wind turbulence and background noise.

Corporate history and activities
Kenneth Dahlberg sold his company Dahlberg, Inc., and its subsidiary Miracle-Ear, to Motorola in 1959, and subsequently reacquired the company in 1964. Miracle-Ear began franchising in 1984. Dahlberg sold the company to Bausch & Lomb in 1993. In 1999 Amplifon acquired Dahlberg, Inc. from Bausch & Lomb, and that year Dahlberg, Inc. and its subsidiary Miracle-Ear, Inc. merged into Miracle-Ear, Inc. In 2014, the company added several locations in Canada, with plans to open more Canadian outlets.

In 1990, the Miracle-Ear Children's Foundation was founded to provide free hearing aids and services to children for families who could not afford hearing aids. The foundation donated more than 6,500 hearing aids to over 4,100 children in the U.S. In 2013, the Miracle-Ear Children's Foundation was transformed into the Miracle-Ear Foundation, in order to provide free hearing aids to both adults and children in need. In 2014, the Miracle-Ear Foundation initiated and co-sponsored "One Day Without Sound", which encourages hearing persons to remove sound from their lives for one day in order to empathize with hearing loss.

Miracle-Ear was a sponsor of the 1996 Summer Olympics in Atlanta, which included a Miracle-Ear Olympic Hearing Center. A technician at the Miracle-Ear Olympic Hearing Center identified that a member of the Rwandan track team had severe hearing loss, and Miracle-Ear assisted the runner so that an ear specialist in the U.S. could perform surgeries which restored the athlete's hearing.

References

External links
Official website

Hearing aid manufacturers
American companies established in 1948
Health care companies established in 1948
Retail companies established in 1948
Health care companies based in Minnesota
Medical technology companies of the United States